The 2nd Guards Infantry Division was a division of the Imperial Russian Army.  Before mobilisation for World War I, the division was based in St-Petersburg under the Guards Corps, also headquartered in St-Petersburg.

Organisation 
(Titles in English)

Organisation of the division just before mobilisation for World War I;

 Divisional Headquarters and Staff
 1st Brigade
 Brigade Headquarters and Staff
 The Moscow Life Guards Regiment
 Life Grenadier Guards
 2nd Brigade
 Brigade Headquarters and Staff
 Pavlovski Life Guard Grenadiers
 Finnish Life Guards Regiment
 2nd Guards Artillery Brigade
 Regiment Headquarters and Staff
 1st Division (battalion)
 2nd Division (battalion)

Commanders 
 1855–1857: Alexander von Wrangel
 1858–1860: KA Belgard
 1878–1881: Illarion Ivanovich Vorontsov-Dashkov
 1881–1885: Timofeyev
 1891–1895: Stepan Vasilyevich Rykachev
 1897–1899: Richard Troyanovich Meves
 1900–1904: Nikolay F Meshetich
 1905–1906: Vladimir Danilov
 1906–1907: Ivan Romanenko
 1907–1908: Adlerberg
 1908–1910: Mikhnevich
 1910–1912: Leonid Lesh
 1912–1913: Vasily Flug
 1913–1914: Alexander Alexeyevich Resin

Chiefs of Staff 
 1863–1865: Victor Fedorovitch Winberg
 1865–1866: Kozen

Commanders of the 1st Brigade 
 1913–1914: Kisielewski

Commanders of the 2nd Brigade 
 1893–1894: Richard Troyanovich Meves

Commanders of the Artillery Brigade 
 1901–1904: Arkady Nikanorovich Nishenkov

References 

Infantry divisions of the Russian Empire